The National Film Award for Best Choreography is one of the National Film Awards presented annually by the Directorate of Film Festivals, the organization set up by Ministry of Information and Broadcasting, India. It is one of several awards presented for feature films and awarded with Rajat Kamal (Silver Lotus).

The award was instituted in 1991 at 39th National Film Awards but awarded first time at 40th National Film Awards and then awarded annually for films produced in the year across the country, in all Indian languages. Hindi (19 awards), Tamil (5 awards), Malayalam (4 awards), Telugu (3 awards), Bengali and Marathi (1 each).

The choreographer who has won most Rajat Kamal (Silver Lotus) for Best Choreography is Saroj Khan with 3 wins followed by Prabhu Deva, Raju Sundaram and Ganesh Acharya with two wins.

Sundaram and Prabhu Deva, Raju Sundaram are the father and son trio who are honored by this award.

Winners 

Award includes 'Rajat Kamal' (Silver Lotus) and cash prize. Following are the award winners over the years:

References

External links 
 Official Page for Directorate of Film Festivals, India
 National Film Awards Archives
 National Film Awards at IMDb

Choreography
Indian choreography awards
Film choreography awards